The 1990–91 Ligue nationale season was the 70th season of the Ligue nationale. Eight teams participated in the league, and Brûleurs de Loups de Grenoble won their third league title.

Regular season

Playoffs

External links
Season on hockeyarchives.info 

France
1990–91 in French ice hockey
Ligue Magnus seasons